Eric Redman may refer to:

 Eric Redman (businessman) (born 1948), American author and businessman
 Eric Redman (politician) (born 1946), Idaho state representative